Mameyand (also known as Ma‘īnad, Mamevand, and Mamīneh Kurdish: مەمێند) is a village in Almahdi Rural District, Mohammadyar District, Naqadeh County, West Azerbaijan Province, Iran. At the 2006 census, its population was 788, in 136 families.

The village is populated by Azerbaijanis and Kurds.

References 

Populated places in Naqadeh County

Kurdish settlements in West Azerbaijan Province